Shafiqur Rahman (10 February 1959 – 19 February 2009) is a Bangladesh Nationalist Party politician and the former Member of Parliament of Moulvibazar-4.

Career
Rahman was elected to parliament from Moulvibazar-4 as a Bangladesh Nationalist Party candidate in February 1996.

References

Bangladesh Nationalist Party politicians
6th Jatiya Sangsad members
1959 births
2009 deaths
People from Moulvibazar District